Ya'akov Asher (born 2 July 1965) is an Israeli Haredi rabbi and politician who currently serves as a member of the Knesset for the United Torah Judaism alliance. A member of the Degel HaTorah party, he previously served as a member of the Knesset between 2013 and 2015, and was also the thirteenth mayor of Bnei Brak, having taken office in 2008.

Biography
Ya'akov Asher was born and raised in Ramat Gan. He served in the Israel Defense Forces. Asher is married, with seven children.

Political career
Asher ran for mayor of El'ad, but lost to Tzuriel Krispel. He became mayor of Bnei Brak in 2008, after 19 years on the city council. He became mayor without an election in the wake of an agreement between Degel HaTorah and Agudat Yisrael to share the post of mayor on an alternating basis.

Prior to the 2013 Knesset elections, Asher was placed seventh on the United Torah Judaism list, and entered the Knesset as the alliance won seven seats. His election to the Knesset meant he had to resign his mayoral position. He was placed seventh on the UTJ list again for the 2015 elections, but lost his seat when the alliance was reduced to six seats. However, he re-entered the Knesset in May 2016 as a replacement for Meir Porush, when he stood down as part of a seat rotation agreement between the parties in United Torah Judaism.

References

External links

1965 births
Living people
Degel HaTorah politicians
Haredi rabbis in Israel
Israeli Ashkenazi Jews
Jewish Israeli politicians
Mayors of places in Israel
Members of the 19th Knesset (2013–2015)
Members of the 20th Knesset (2015–2019)
Members of the 21st Knesset (2019)
Members of the 22nd Knesset (2019–2020)
Members of the 23rd Knesset (2020–2021)
Members of the 24th Knesset (2021–2022)
Members of the 25th Knesset (2022–)
People from Ramat Gan
Rabbinic members of the Knesset
Rabbis in Bnei Brak
United Torah Judaism politicians
Yiddish-speaking people